Samat Merdenuly Daniyar (born 24 January 1999) is a Kazakhstani ice hockey player for Barys Astana in the Kontinental Hockey League (KHL) and the Kazakhstani national team.

He represented Kazakhstan at the 2021 IIHF World Championship.

References

External links

1999 births
Living people
Barys Nur-Sultan players
HC Astana players
Kazakhstani ice hockey defencemen
Sportspeople from Astana